William Clark (8 September 1905 — 6 April 1990) was a Scottish first-class cricketer, cricket administrator, and solicitor.

Early life and education 
Clark was born in September 1905 at Crieff, Perthshire. He was educated at the Grove Academy.

Career 
A club cricketer for Stirling County Cricket Club, Clark made a single appearance in first-class cricket for Scotland as a wicket-keeper against Ireland at Greenock in 1946. Batting twice in the match, he was dismissed for 4 runs in the Scottish first innings by John Hill, while in their second innings he was dismissed for 9 runs by the same bowler; in his capacity as wicket-keeper, he took a single catch and made a single stumping. Clark later served as the president of the Scottish Cricket Union in 1958, succeeding W. D. Ritchie. By profession, Clark was a solicitor who was a senior partner in the firm J. M. & J. Mailer.

Personal life 
Clark died at Kildean Hospital in Stirling on 6 April 1990.

References

External links
 

1905 births
1990 deaths
People from Crieff
People educated at Grove Academy
Scottish solicitors
Scottish cricketers
Scottish cricket administrators